Gameshow Marathon is a British game show, broadcast on ITV from 17 September 2005 to 26 May 2007. After a quick retrospective look at the history of the particular show, the show itself is recreated. This involves recreating the original set and using original opening programme titles, including the appropriate producer ident (excluding Blankety Blank). All participants are celebrities, and any prizes won go into a "Viewer Prize Mountain" which is awarded to a viewer via a phone-in competition.

Series 1 (2005)
Ant & Dec's Gameshow Marathon is a seven-episode special event aired in 2005 on Britain's ITV Network, as part of a celebration of ITV's 50th anniversary. In it, hosts Ant & Dec presided over recreations of seven classic game shows that had been seen on the network. Six celebrity contestants competed in a series-long tournament, receiving a donation to their favourite charity for their participation. In addition, home viewers were given the opportunity to win the cash and prizes each episode's winning contestant "won" via telephone.

The programme was co-produced by Granada Productions/ITV Productions and Thames Television/Talkback Thames.

The shows recreated were:

The celebrity contestants in series 1 were:
Eamonn Holmes (TV presenter, News anchor)
Vernon Kay (TV presenter)
Patsy Kensit (Emmerdale actress)
William Roache (Coronation Street actor)
Carol Vorderman (TV presenter)
Ruby Wax (TV presenter, comedian)

The series was run as a three-round tournament. In the first round, each show was played by every contestant who had not already won a show. The four winners from the first round then competed in single-elimination format.

Carol Vorderman was the eventual winner of the series. The Golden Shot was broadcast live like the original show, and Sale of the Century with organist Keith Beckingham and had a dedication at the end to comedian Ronnie Barker, who had died five days earlier.

Following the series, several of the shows were revived; Bullseye returned on the game show channel Challenge, followed by The Price Is Right and Family Fortunes (in a celebrity format) on ITV, the latter hosted by one of the Gameshow Marathon celebrities, Vernon Kay. (Ironically, on Kay's Family Fortunes, the Vorderman family would play the game again. They did not win on their second attempt, however.) However, Family Fortunes was brought back again in 2020 presented by Gino D'Acampo.

Les Dennis presented the prizes each week to the winners of the home viewer competition.

Progression

Series 2 (2007)

Gameshow Marathon was presented by series 1 runner-up Vernon Kay. The programme aired every Saturday night on ITV from 7 April to 26 May 2007.

The shows that were played were:

* Was previously shown on BBC One, from 1979 to 1990 and 1997 to 1999.
Bold type indicates the pre-programme ident used.

The celebrities competing in series 2 were:
Andrea Catherwood (TV presenter, News anchor)
Jamelia (singer)
Graeme Le Saux (footballer)
Michael Le Vell (Coronation Street actor)
Wendy Richard (former EastEnders actress)
Ben Shephard (TV presenter)

There was a slight change to the format for this series. As before, each show in the first round was played by those celebrities who have not already won a show. However, the remaining rounds were each a single show played by all celebrities still in the tournament: five in the quarter-final, three in the semi-final and two in the final.

The celebrity panellists for Blankety Blank were Andrew Castle, Fern Britton, Joe Pasquale, Holly Willoughby, Vic Reeves, and Lorraine Chase aka Steph Stokes.

The special guests on The Golden Shot were Jo Brand and Jim Bowen.

The celebrity conductor on Name That Tune was Noddy Holder. The celebrity instrument players were Antony Cotton aka Sean Tully on the tubular bells, Carley Stenson on the recorder, Adele Silva aka Kelly Windsor on the xylophone and Kelvin Fletcher aka Andy Sugden on the swanee whistle. The celebrity pianist in the Bid-a-Note round was Myleene Klass.

In Mr. and Mrs., the celebrities invited their real-life partners to play along.

On Bullseye, the celebrities were paired up with professional dart players. Andrea was paired with Martin Adams, Graeme was paired with Phil Taylor and Michael was paired with Raymond van Barneveld. Tony Green reprised his role as the scorer.

On Play Your Cards Right, each celebrity invited another celebrity to play with them. Graeme played with Kyran Bracken and Michael played with Kym Ryder.

On the Blankety Blank and Mr and Mrs editions, the more recent revivals of both series were not mentioned on Gameshow Marathon, due to Blankety Blank having been presented by Paul O'Grady (no footage of him), who was then in a legal dispute with ITV.

Following the series, three of the shows were revived; Mr. and Mrs. (in a celebrity format) on ITV in 2008, Blockbusters on Challenge in 2012 for one series and then on Comedy Central in 2019, and Blankety Blank revived as a Christmas special on ITV in 2016 with David Walliams, and then from in 2020 on BBC One as a Christmas special and subsequent series, hosted by Bradley Walsh .

Lionel Blair presented the prizes each week to the winners of the home viewer competition.

Progression

International versions 

In Mexico, it also has its own version of Gameshow Marathon as well, as part of Teleton's charity funds for 2007. Marco Antonio Regil hosts the marathon, which includes its versions of The Price Is Right (Atínale al Precio) and Family Fortunes (100 Mexicanos Dijeron). It's on Televisa.

See also
Alan Carr's Epic Gameshow

References

External links
.
(German Version) (New Website)
(German version) (old website)

Ant & Dec
2000s British game shows
2005 British television series debuts
2007 British television series endings
English-language television shows
ITV game shows
Television series by Fremantle (company)
Television series by ITV Studios